A fossil is the mineralized remains of a dead organism.

Fossil may also refer to:

Literature
Fossil (novel), a 1993 book written by Hal Clement
The Fossil (play), a 1925 play by Carl Sternheim
Pauline, Petrova and Posy Fossil, characters in the 1936 novel Ballet Shoes

Music
Fossils (band), a rock band from Kolkata, India
Fossils (album), a 1991 album by Dinosaur Jr.
"Fossil", a song by His Name is Alive from the album Livonia
Fossiles, the 12th movement in the musical suite The Carnival of the Animals

Technology
FOSSIL, a protocol for serial communications
Fossil (software), the source code control for programmers
Fossil (file system), the file system in Plan 9 from Bell Labs

Places
Fossil, Oregon, US, a town
Fossil, Wyoming, a former settlement near Fossil Butte National Monument, US

Other uses
Fossil (Pokémon Trading Card Game)
The Fossil (film), a 1972 Japanese film
Fossil Group, a clothing and accessories company
Fossilization (linguistics), a type of bound morpheme

See also